Luisa Gan (born 12 September 1994) is a former Singaporean actress, model and contracted artiste under MediaCorp. She was prominently a full-time Mediacorp artiste in 2015–2016. She was Miss Singapore 2014 and she has represented Singapore in the Miss Universe pageant .

Filmography

Miss Universe 2016

References

1994 births
21st-century Singaporean actresses
Singaporean female models
Living people